In Orbit is an album by jazz trumpeter Clark Terry, also featuring Thelonious Monk, which was recorded in New York on May 7 & 12, 1958.

It was Monk's only Riverside appearance as sideman, the first of Terry's recordings on flugelhorn, and the first Riverside date with bassist Sam Jones.

Monk introduced Riverside to some its most important artists, including Johnny Griffin, Wilbur Ware, Sonny Rollins, and Terry.

It features one Monk composition, "Let's Cool One"

Track listing 
"In Orbit" (Terry)
"One Foot in the Gutter (Terry)
"Trust In Me" (Wever, Schwartz, Ager)
"Let's Cool One" (Monk)
"Pea-Eye" (Terry)
"Argentia" (Terry)
"Moonlight Fiesta" (Mills, Tizol)
"Buck's Business" (Terry)
"Very Near Blue" (Sara Cassey)
"Flugelin' the Blues" (Terry), additional track not on original LP release.

Personnel 
 Clark Terry – flugelhorn
 Thelonious Monk – piano
 Sam Jones – bass
 Philly Joe Jones – drums

References 

1958 albums
Clark Terry albums
Riverside Records albums
Jazzland Records (1960) albums
Albums produced by Orrin Keepnews